The telluride bromides are chemical compounds that contain both telluride ions (Te2−) and bromide ions (Br−). They are in the class of mixed anion compounds or chalcogenide halides.

In many tellurium bromide compounds, tellurium atoms link up in a helix, similar to pure tellurium structure. In Rhenium compounds tellurium atoms form a cluster with rhenium atoms. In some materials, tellurium forms a honeycomb like structure containing tubes filled with bromine and the other elements.

List

References

Tellurides
Bromides
Double salts